The 2007–08 Eredivisie season was the 48th season of the Eredivisie, the top level of ice hockey in the Netherlands. Seven teams participated in the league, and the Tilburg Trappers won the championship.

Regular season

Playoffs

External links
Season on hockeyarchives.info

Neth
Eredivisie (ice hockey) seasons
Ere 
Ere